The 2011 Women's Premier League Rugby season was the third season of the Women's Premier League in the United States. It began on September 10 and involved eight teams.

Format 
Oregon Sports Union was relegated in the off-season and the San Diego Surfers had their first year as a part of the WPL. The eight teams were divided into two conferences, Red and Blue, comprising four teams. They each played six conference games, one home and one away. The WPL season occurred in the fall, concurrently with the regular women's club season, with the National Championship being held in November 11–13.For the Finals, teams were seeded based on the results of their conference during the regular season. The top four teams competed for the Cup and the bottom teams for the Bowl.

Conference standings 
Conference standings are as follows:

Red Conference

Blue Conference

Matches

Week 1

Week 2

Week 3

Week 4

Week 5

Week 6

Playoffs

Bowl Semifinals

Cup Semifinals

Bowl Finals

7th Place Final

5th Place Final

Cup Finals

3rd Place Final

Grand Final

References

External links 

 USA Rugby Women's Premier League official site

Women's Premier League
Women's Premier League